"The lady's not for turning" was a phrase used by Margaret Thatcher, then Prime Minister, in her speech to the Conservative Party Conference on 10 October 1980. The term has thus been applied as a name to the speech in its entirety.  It is considered a defining speech in Thatcher's political development, becoming something of a Thatcherite motto.

The phrase made reference to Thatcher's refusal to perform a "U-turn" in response to opposition to her liberalisation of the economy, which some commentators as well as her predecessor as Conservative leader Edward Heath had urged, mainly because unemployment had risen to 2 million by the autumn of 1980 from 1.5 million the previous year and the economy was in recession, with unemployment exceeding 3 million by the time the recession ended in 1982.

It was written by the playwright Sir Ronald Millar, who had been Thatcher's speech-writer since 1973, and was a pun on the 1948 play The Lady's Not for Burning by Christopher Fry, although Thatcher missed the reference herself.  Millar had intended the "you turn if you want to" line, which preceded it, to be the most popular, and it received an ovation itself, but it was "the lady's not for turning" that received the headlines. At the time, Thatcher was already being referred to as the "Iron Lady", which originated from a Soviet journalist.

The speech as a whole was very warmly received at the conference, and received a five-minute standing ovation.

Excerpt

See also
The Lady's Not for Burning

Footnotes

External links
 Full text of the speech
 Video clip (excerpt, 30 seconds)

Speeches by Margaret Thatcher
Political quotes
British political phrases
1980 neologisms
Cold War speeches
1980 in politics
1980 in British politics
October 1980 events in the United Kingdom